Evelyn Patuawa-Nathan is a Māori writer. She was born in Northland, New Zealand, and lived in Europe and Asia before permanently settling in Sydney, Australia.

Her first published work Opening Doors, a collection of poetry, was published in 1979 by Mana Publications (Suva, Fiji). She is believed to be the third female writer of Māori origin to be published, following Patricia Grace, whose collection of short stories Waiariki published in 1975 by Penguin Books, and Vernice Wineera who has published several works of poetry since 1976.

According to the blurb of Opening Doors, Patuawa-Nathan had completed a historical novel years before which Collins of London had considered publishing, however the sole manuscript of the text was lost in the mail. Evelyn "didn't have another copy nor the staying power to stick with it."

During the same period she attempted to establish a Māori Writers Society with other prominent Māori writers Hone Tuwhare and Harry Dansey. While this attempt failed, a similar organisation of Māori Writers and Artists Association is now thriving in New Zealand.

Contrary to other Māori writers of her generation such as Patricia Grace and Witi Ihimaera, her work has often been overlooked in New Zealand, possibly because she is no longer based there.

She has several works of poetry that remain as yet unpublished. She currently resides in Sydney where she has worked as a teacher and as a tutor in a number of women's prisons.

Published works
 "Opening Doors" (Mana Publications, Fiji, 1979)

References

External links
 http://www.pacificislandbooks.com/nzficsongpoet.htm
 https://openlibrary.org/b/OL539756M/Opening_doors

New Zealand Māori writers
New Zealand women poets
Living people
Year of birth missing (living people)
New Zealand emigrants to Australia
20th-century New Zealand poets
20th-century New Zealand women writers